Auden Heanon Tate (born February 3, 1997) is an American football wide receiver for the Arizona Cardinals of the National Football League (NFL). He played college football at Florida State, and was drafted by the Cincinnati Bengals in the 2018 NFL Draft.

Early life
Tate attended Paul R. Wharton High School in Tampa, Florida. He committed to Florida State University to play college football.

College career
Tate played at Florida State from 2015 to 2017. After his junior season in 2017, he decided to forgo his senior year and enter the 2018 NFL Draft. He finished his career with 65 receptions for 957 yards and 16 touchdowns.

Collegiate statistics

Professional career

Cincinnati Bengals

2018
Tate was drafted by the Cincinnati Bengals in the seventh round, 253rd overall, of the 2018 NFL Draft. He was a healthy scratch for the first six games of the season before being waived on October 18, 2018 and re-signed to the practice squad. On November 5, he was promoted to the active roster. In Week 11, against the Baltimore Ravens, he made his first professional reception, a five-yard catch, in the 24–21 loss. He totaled four receptions for 35 receiving yards as a rookie.

2019
In Week 5 against the Arizona Cardinals, Tate caught three passes for 26 yards and his first career receiving touchdown in the 26-23 loss.  In a Week 6 loss to the Baltimore Ravens, Tate caught five passes for a career high 91 yards. On December 10, 2019, he was placed on injured reserve with a knee injury. He finished the season as the Bengals second-leading receiver with 40 catches for 575 yards and one touchdown.

2020
Tate was placed on the reserve/COVID-19 list by the team on November 25, 2020, and activated on November 28. On December 2, 2020, he was placed on injured reserve.

2021
On December 4, 2021, Tate was placed on injured reserve with a calf injury.

Atlanta Falcons
On March 28, 2022, Tate signed with the Atlanta Falcons. He was released on August 23, 2022.

Philadelphia Eagles
On September 7, 2022, Tate was signed to the Philadelphia Eagles practice squad. On November 16, 2022, Tate was released from the Philadelphia Eagles’ practice squad. He was re-signed to the practice squad the next day. He was released on December 13.

Arizona Cardinals
On January 4, 2023, Tate was signed to the Arizona Cardinals practice squad. He signed a reserve/future contract on January 11, 2023.

References

External links
Cincinnati Bengals bio
Florida State Seminoles bio

1997 births
Living people
People from Irmo, South Carolina
Players of American football from South Carolina
American football wide receivers
Florida State Seminoles football players
Cincinnati Bengals players
Atlanta Falcons players
Philadelphia Eagles players
Arizona Cardinals players